Clinocardium  is a genus of marine bivalve molluscs in the family Cardiidae, the cockles. It is monotypic, being represented by the single species Clinocardium nuttallii, also known as the basket cockle or Nuttall's cockle, a large edible saltwater clam.

Native to the coastlines of California and the Pacific Northwest, this species can be found from the Bering Sea to Southern California and has been used by the indigenous peoples of California and the Pacific Northwest as food.

References

 Biodiversity of the Central Coast entry 
 WoRMS entry 

Cardiidae
Bivalve genera
Fauna of California
Seafood in Native American cuisine
Bivalves described in 1837